M̃ (majuscule: M̃, minuscule: m̃) is a Latin M with a diacritical tilde.

Linguistic use
M̃–m̃ is or was used as a grapheme in several languages:
 in some languages of Vanuatu, such as North Efate, South Efate and Namakura, it represents a labial-velar nasal . The letter was introduced by missionaries and has been in use for over a hundred years. (Other Vanuatu languages use an M-macron |m̄| instead.)
 in the Yanesha' language of Peru, m̃ represents a palatalized m
 in Lithuanian, m̃ appears as part of diphthongs
 in the transliteration of the Lycian script, it represents a syllabic m.

In Italian, the abbreviation Ssm̃o or SSm̃o may be used for Santissimo, "most holy" (similarly Latin Ssm̃us for Sanctissimus).

Symbolic use
M̃ and m̃ are used in mathematics and physics, see Tilde#Mathematics and Tilde#Physics

Computer use

On the Apple ABC extended keyboard, m̃ is made by typing m and then option-shift n.

Latin letters with diacritics